Egor Gerasimov was the defending champion but lost in the second round to Jürgen Zopp.

Ričardas Berankis won the title after defeating Constant Lestienne 6–2, 5–7, 6–4 in the final.

Seeds

Draw

Finals

Top half

Bottom half

References
Main Draw
Qualifying Draw

Open Harmonie mutuelle - Singles
2018 Singles